Anil Gözütok (born 27 October 2000) is a German professional footballer who plays as a midfielder for Wormatia Worms.

References

2000 births
German people of Turkish descent
Sportspeople from Tübingen
Footballers from Baden-Württemberg
Living people
German footballers
Association football midfielders
1. FC Kaiserslautern players
1. FC Kaiserslautern II players
Wormatia Worms players
3. Liga players
Regionalliga players